Bushtricë is a village and a former municipality in Kukës County, Albania. At the 2015 local government reform it became a subdivision of the municipality Kukës. The population at the 2011 census was 1,486. The municipal unit consists of the following villages:

 Bushtricë
 Gjegje
 Matranxhë
 Palush
 Vilë
 Barruq
 Shpat

References

Former municipalities in Kukës County
Administrative units of Kukës
Villages in Kukës County